The Pondicherry Makkal Congress, or Puducherry Makkal Congress (Puducherry Popular Congress), was a political party in the Indian union territory Puducherry (formerly known as Pondicherry). The PMC was formed as a splinter group of the Tamil Maanila Congress. The leader of the PMC was P. Kannan. In the assembly elections of Puducherry in 2001, the PMC won four seat (out of 30). Until 2001, the PMC supported the National Democratic Alliance, but then it started to support Indian National Congress. In August 2002 the PMC merged with the INC.

However, P. Kannan left Congress after that Democratic Progressive Alliance had allotted the Puducherry seat to Pattali Makkal Katchi ahead of the 2004 Lok Sabha elections.

As of 2005, P.Kannan had formed a new party, the Puducherry Munnetra Congress.

See also
Indian National Congress breakaway parties

Defunct political parties in Puducherry
2002 disestablishments in India
Political parties disestablished in 2002
Political parties with year of establishment missing